Suicide Squad: Hell to Pay is a 2018 American adult animated superhero film produced by Warner Bros. Animation and distributed by Warner Bros. Home Entertainment. The film was produced and directed by Sam Liu and written by Alan Burnett (his last work before his retirement). It is the 31st film of the DC Universe Animated Original Movies and the tenth film of the DC Animated Movie Universe. The voice cast includes Christian Slater as Deadshot, Tara Strong as Harley Quinn and Vanessa Williams as Amanda Waller. The film was released digitally on March 27, 2018 and released on DVD and Blu-ray on April 10.

Plot
 
Three years ago, Amanda Waller dispatches Task Force X, a secret operative of criminals with nanite bombs implanted in their head, led by the hitman Deadshot, to retrieve a hard drive containing leaked intelligence from Tobias Whale. However, after the mission succeeds, members Count Vertigo and Jewelee betray the team, and plan to steal the drive for themselves, killing team member Punch in the process. Waller, having overheard the conversation through their communication system, detonates Vertigo's nanite bomb while Deadshot mercy-kills Jewelee as Waller prepares to detonate her bomb.

In the present-day, Waller learns she had been diagnosed with a terminal illness but discovers the existence of a powerful artifact, a card with the phrase "Get Out of Hell Free" printed on its surface.  According to legend, anyone possessing the card when they die is able to bypass Hell and gain access to Heaven regardless of whatever sins they committed in life. The card is revealed to currently be in the possession of male stripper Steele Maxum, who formerly wielded the mantle of Doctor Fate, given to him by the spirit of Nabu.

Waller recruits criminals Harley Quinn, Captain Boomerang, Killer Frost, Copperhead, and Bronze Tiger to retrieve the card. Rivaling Waller's team are Vandal Savage and his daughter Scandal, and speedster Reverse-Flash, and his team consisting of Silver Banshee, and Blockbuster, who are all also after the card. Waller's team find Maxum performing at a strip club but are confronted by the Reverse-Flash and his team. Waller's team manage to defeat Reverse-Flash's team and escape with Maxum. The team learn that the card had been stolen from Maxum by Scandal and her lover Knockout, which led to Maxum losing his mantle of Doctor Fate.

Upon arriving at Scandal and Knockout's apartment, Waller's team extract the card, however, they are intercepted by Savage and his men. Savage retrieves the card and wounds Knockout, nearly killing her. As Savage escapes, Reverse-Flash places a tracker on his ship. Meanwhile, Deadshot fails to find his daughter Zoe, and is forced to return to the team by Bronze Tiger. While stopping at a gas station, the Reverse-Flash kidnaps Killer Frost, removing her bomb, and convincing her to join his team. Using Killer Frost, the Reverse-Flash lures Waller's team and detonates her bomb, wounding Tiger. To gain revenge on her father, Scandal reveals his whereabouts where Waller's team are captured by Savage. Savage reveals he had Professor Pyg implant the card into his chest, before killing Pyg. Reverse-Flash then finds Savage and uses his abilities to phase through Savage's body and take the card, resulting in Savage's death.

Reverse-Flash explains to Deadshot he was killed in another timeline by their version of Batman, but managed to survive by using the most dangerous and strongest "Speed Force" ability to temporarily delay his death despite slowly fading out of existence. Killer Frost double-crosses Reverse-Flash by killing Silver Banshee and Blockbuster. Copperhead and Killer Frost battle for the card until Waller detonates Copperhead's bomb, killing them both. 

Bronze Tiger battles Reverse-Flash, but Reverse-Flash slices him multiple times with a small dagger. Tiger, dying from blood loss, uses the last of his strength to cut the card from Zoom's fingers. Deadshot kills Reverse-Flash and gives the card to Tiger, who dies and ascends to Heaven. With only Harley Quinn and Captain Boomerang remaining alive in his team, Deadshot gives the now-useless card to the unsuspecting Waller before leaving. Having served his time, Deadshot visits Zoe as a free man.

Voice cast

Production
This film was announced at San Diego Comic-Con in July 2017. It features an original story by Alan Burnett marking his last film before retirement.

Tie-in media
On March 21, a 12-issue digital comic was released on a weekly basis. Written by Jeff Parker with artwork by Matthew Dow Smith, Agustin Padilla, Stefano Raffaele and Cat Staggs, the story takes place immediately after the events of the film as Amanda Waller is still looking to avoid death. With the Spectre bearing down on her, she enlists Jason Blood a.k.a. Etrigan into her team for their latest mission. The series was then released in a trade paperback collecting all 12 issues on February 13, 2019.

Reception

Sales
The film earned $851,440 from domestic DVD sales and $1,976,142 from domestic Blu-ray sales, bringing its total domestic home video earnings to $2,834,427.

Critical response

IGN awarded Suicide Squad: Hell to Pay a score of 7.5 out of 10, saying that while not everything in the film worked, it deserves praise for its "sense of humor, willingness to kill off key characters, and exploration of a spiritual subject". WeGotThisCovered.com gave it a 9/10, calling it one of the best DC animated films, praising its writing and fun tone. A Comicsverse review by Chris Zhang notes problems with graphics, but Zhang still calls it the best Suicide Squad film ever, noting it is giving a correct portrayal of the Squad as "a bunch of backstabbing criminals being managed by a backstabbing bureaucrat" instead of a comparatively friendly team like the 2016 film.

Accolades
The film was nominated for the Golden Reel Award for Outstanding Achievement in Sound Editing – Sound Effects, Foley, Music, Dialogue and ADR for Non-Theatrical Animated Long Form Broadcast Media award.

Notes

References

External links

 DC page: movie
 

2010s American animated films
2010s direct-to-video animated superhero films
2010s animated superhero films
2018 LGBT-related films
2010s road movies
2018 animated films
2018 direct-to-video films
American LGBT-related films
American adult animated films
DC Animated Movie Universe
2010s English-language films
Films produced by Sam Register
Films directed by Sam Liu
LGBT-related animated superhero films
Warner Bros. Animation animated films
Suicide Squad films
Martyrdom in fiction
Films set in 2018
Films with screenplays by Alan Burnett